TAT1 may refer to:
TAT-1, first submarine transatlantic telephone cable system
TAT1 (gene), human gene